The following people died in September 2011.

Entries for each day are listed alphabetically by surname. A typical entry lists information in the following sequence:
 Name, age, country of citizenship at birth, subsequent country of citizenship (if applicable), reason for notability, cause of death (if known), and reference.

September 2011

1
Sidney Asch, 92, American lawyer, judge, and author.
Mark Blackburn, 58, British numismatist, cancer.
Jan Lammers, 84, Dutch Olympic athlete (1948).
*Liu Huang A-tao, 90, Taiwanese activist, first comfort woman to sue Japan for compensation.
Abdulrahman al-Nuaimi, 67, Bahraini opposition leader, founder of the PFLB and the NDA.
Alexandru Pesamosca, 81, Romanian surgeon and pediatrician, cardiac arrest.
Kamal Salibi, 82, Lebanese historian.

2
Edgar Benson, 88, Canadian politician and diplomat.
Roberto Bruce, 32, Chilean television journalist, plane crash.
Felipe Camiroaga, 44, Chilean television presenter, plane crash.
Tony Corsari, 84, Belgian television host, cancer.
Allan Hubbard, 83, New Zealand businessman, car accident.
Shrinivas Khale, 85, Indian composer.
Lennart Magnusson, 87, Swedish Olympic silver medal-winning (1952) fencer.
José María Montes, 91, Argentine Roman Catholic prelate, Bishop of Chascomús (1983–1996).
Katsuichi Mori, 81, Japanese Olympic diver.
Noramfaizul Mohd Nor, 39, Malaysian television camera operator (Bernama), shot.
Trulshik Rinpoche, 88, Tibetan lama.
Jehangir Sabavala, 89, Indian artist.
Bernard Smith, 94, Australian art historian and critic.
Alberto Zalamea Costa, 82, Colombian journalist and politician, Ambassador to Côte d'Ivoire, Venezuela and Italy.

3
Renato Barisani, 92, Italian sculptor and painter.
Júlia Bonet Fité, 89, Andorran businesswoman.
Julio Casas Regueiro, 75, Cuban politician, Vice President and Defense Minister (since 2008), heart attack.
Andrzej Maria Deskur, 87, Polish Roman Catholic cardinal, President of the Pontifical Council for Social Communications (1973–1984).
Don Fambrough, 88, American football player and head coach (University of Kansas), injuries from a fall.
Finn Helgesen, 92, Norwegian Olympic gold medal-winning (1948) speed skater.
John Hoover, 91, American artist.
Sándor Képíró, 97, Hungarian World War II veteran acquitted of Nazi war crimes.
Sumant Misra, 88, Indian tennis player.

4
Lalla Aicha, 81, Moroccan princess, first female Arab ambassador, Ambassador to United Kingdom (1965–1969); Greece (1969–1970); Italy (1970–1973).
Hugh Fox, 79, American poet and novelist.
Hilde Heltberg, 51, Norwegian musician, cancer.
Dave Hoover, 56, American comics artist (Captain America, Starman).
Bill Kunkel, 61, American video game designer and magazine editor, heart attack.
Mino Martinazzoli, 79, Italian politician, after long illness.
Jag Mundhra, 62, Indian film director (Bawandar).
Hakkı Boran Ögelman, 71, Turkish physicist.
Lee Roy Selmon, 56, American Hall of Fame football player (Tampa Bay Buccaneers), stroke.
Sarah Webb, British housing executive.
Dana Wilson, 28, New Zealand rugby league player, car accident.

5
Robert Ballaman, 85, Swiss footballer, participated in 1954 World Cup.
Reidar Børjeson, 80, Norwegian Olympic figure skater (1952).
Andrew Zolile T. Brook, 81, South African Roman Catholic prelate, Bishop of Umtata (1979–1995).
Angioletta Coradini, 65, Italian astrophysicist, cancer.
Charles S. Dubin, 92, American film and television director (Hawaii Five-O, Kojak, M*A*S*H).
Carol Frick, 78, American Olympic diver.
Salvatore Licitra, 43, Italian tenor, injuries from a motor scooter accident.
Vann Nath, 66, Cambodian painter.
Bobby Rhine, 35, American soccer player (FC Dallas), heart attack.
Peter Thuruthikonam, 82, Indian Roman Catholic prelate, Bishop of Vijayapuram (1988–2006), heart attack.

6
Hans Apel, 79, German politician, Finance Minister (1974–1978) and Defence Minister (1978–1982).
Jordan Belson, 85, American filmmaker, heart failure.
Bruce Dan, 64, American researcher (toxic shock syndrome), complications of a bone marrow transplant.
Dan David, 82, Romanian-born Israeli businessman and philanthropist, brain hemorrhage.
Archduke Felix of Austria, 95, Austrian royal, last surviving child of Charles I of Austria.
Michael S. Hart, 64, American author, inventor of the e-book and founder of Project Gutenberg, heart attack.
George Kuchar, 69, American film director, prostate cancer.
Little Tokyo, 70, Japanese professional wrestler, heart attack.
Ted Longshaw, 85, British businessman and sports administrator.
Janusz Morgenstern, 88, Polish filmmaker.
Wardell Quezergue, 81, American music arranger, producer and bandleader, heart failure.
Raphaël Marie Ze, 78, Cameroonian Roman Catholic prelate, Bishop of Sangmélima (1992–2008).

7
Max Boisot, 67, British academic, cancer.
Gabriel Bullet, 90, Swiss Roman Catholic prelate, Auxiliary Bishop of Lausanne, Geneva and Fribourg (1970–1993).
Derek Grierson, 79, Scottish footballer.
*Jang Hyo-jo, 55, South Korean baseball player (Samsung Lions, Lotte Giants), liver cancer.
Harold Mair, 92, Australian politician.
Eddie Marshall, 73, American jazz drummer.
Gabriel Valdés, 92, Chilean politician and diplomat, President of the Senate of Chile (1990–1996), Foreign Minister (1964–1970).
Hiroe Yuki, 62, Japanese badminton player.
Notable ice hockey players and coaches among the 44 killed in the 2011 Lokomotiv Yaroslavl plane crash:
Vitali Anikeyenko, 24, Ukrainian defenseman (Metallurg Novokuznetsk)
Mikhail Balandin, 31, Russian defenseman (UHC Dynamo, HC CSKA Moscow, Mytishchi Atlant)
Gennady Churilov, 24, Russian centre (Lokomotiv Yaroslavl)
Pavol Demitra, 36, Slovakian centre (St. Louis Blues, Vancouver Canucks, Minnesota Wild)
Robert Dietrich, 25, German defenseman (DEG Metro Stars, Milwaukee Admirals, EC Peiting)
Marat Kalimulin, 23, Russian defenseman (HC Lada Togliatti, Lokomotiv Yaroslavl)
Alexander Kalyanin, 23, Russian right wing (Lokomotiv Yaroslavl)
Alexander Karpovtsev, 41, Russian coach and former player (New York Rangers, Chicago Blackhawks, HC Dynamo Moscow), world champion (as player, 1993)
Andrei Kiryukhin, 24, Russian right wing (Lokomotiv Yaroslavl)
Nikita Klyukin, 21, Russian centre (Lokomotiv Yaroslavl), world U18 champion (2007)
Igor Korolev, 41, Russian coach and former player (Winnipeg Jets, Toronto Maple Leafs, Atlant Moscow Oblast)
Stefan Liv, 30, Swedish goalie (HV71, Toledo Storm, HC Sibir), Olympic gold medalist (2006), world champion (2006)
Jan Marek, 31, Czech centre (HC Oceláři Třinec, HC Sparta Praha, Metallurg Magnitogorsk)
Brad McCrimmon, 52, Canadian coach and former player (Philadelphia Flyers, Detroit Red Wings, Hartford Whalers)
Sergei Ostapchuk, 21, Belarusian right wing (Rouyn-Noranda Huskies, Lokomotiv Yaroslavl)
Karel Rachůnek, 32, Czech defenseman (Ottawa Senators, Orli Znojmo, New Jersey Devils), world champion (2010)
Ruslan Salei, 36, Belarusian defenseman (Colorado Avalanche, Florida Panthers, Anaheim Ducks)
Maxim Shuvalov, 18, Russian defenseman (Lokomotiv Yaroslavl)
Kārlis Skrastiņš, 37, Latvian defenseman (Nashville Predators, Dallas Stars, HK Riga 2000)
Pavel Snurnitsyn, 19, Russian left wing (Lokomotiv Yaroslavl)
Daniil Sobchenko, 20, Russian centre (Lokomotiv Yaroslavl), world junior champion (2011)
Ivan Tkachenko, 31, Russian left/right wing (HC Neftekhimik Nizhnekamsk, Lokomotiv Yaroslavl)
Pavel Trakhanov, 33, Russian defenseman (HC MVD, Severstal Cherepovets, HC CSKA Moscow)
Yuri Urychev, 20, Russian defenseman (Lokomotiv Yaroslavl), world junior champion (2011)
Josef Vašíček, 30, Czech centre (Carolina Hurricanes, New York Islanders, HC Slavia Prague), world junior champion (2000), world champion (2005)
Alexander Vasyunov, 23, Russian left wing (Lowell Devils, Lokomotiv Yaroslavl)
Alexander Vyukhin, 38, Ukrainian goalie (Sokil Kyiv, HC Sibir, Avangard Omsk)
Artem Yarchuk, 21, Russian left wing (Lokomotiv Yaroslavl)

8
David Bitner, 62, American political leader, Chairman of the Republican Party of Florida (2011), amyotrophic lateral sclerosis.
Mary Fickett, 83, American actress (All My Children), complications of Alzheimer's disease.
Jesse Jefferson, 62, American baseball player (Baltimore Orioles, Toronto Blue Jays), prostate cancer.
Usman Jibrin, 68–69, Nigerian air force officer and politician, Governor of North Central State (1975–1977).
Keo Nakama, 91, American swimmer.
Sir Hilary Synnott, 66, British diplomat.
Võ Chí Công, 99, Vietnamese politician, President (1987–1992).
Emilianos Zacharopoulos, 96, Turkish-born Greek Orthodox hierarch, Metropolitan (since 1959).

9
Valentino Braitenberg, 85, Italian neuroscientist.
Werner Geeser, 63, Swiss Olympic cross-country skier, cancer.
Laurie Hughes, 87, English football player (Liverpool).
Daniel Hulet, 66, Belgian cartoonist.
William Lesick, 88, Canadian politician, MP for Edmonton East (1984–1988).
Herbert Lomas, 87, British poet.
*Ignace Matondo Kwa Nzambi, 79, Congolese Roman Catholic prelate, Bishop of Basankusu (1974–1998) and Molegbe (1998–2007). 
Khairy Shalaby, 73, Egyptian writer.
Peter Sneath, 87, British microbiologist.

10
David E. L. Choong, 82, Malaysian badminton player.
Graham Collier, 74, British jazz bassist.
Bernice Lake, 78, Anguillan-born Antiguan jurist, first Eastern Caribbean woman to be appointed Queen's Counsel.
Cecil Marshall, 71, Canadian cricketer.
Sabino Augusto Montanaro, 89, Paraguayan politician, Minister of the Interior (1968–1989).
Eric Prabhakar, 86, Indian Olympic athlete (1948).
Cliff Robertson, 88, American actor (Charly, Spider-Man, PT 109), Oscar winner (1969).
Sam Pata Emani Tagelagi, 75, Niuean politician, first Speaker of the Niue Assembly (1976–1993), long illness.

11
Douglas Allen, Baron Croham, 93, British civil servant, Head of the Home Civil Service (1974–1977).
Art Atwood, 37, American bodybuilder, heart attack.
Christian Bakkerud, 26, Danish racing driver, injuries sustained in a car accident.
Lilly Bølviken, 97, Norwegian judge.
Cliff Brittle, 69, English sports administrator, Chairman of the Rugby Football Union (1996–1998).
Shirley Chambers, 97, American actress.
Cláudio Deodato, 64, Brazilian Olympic footballer (1968).
Arthur Evans, 68, American gay rights activist and author, aortic aneurysm.
Ralph Gubbins, 79, English football player (Bolton Wanderers, Hull City, Tranmere Rovers).
İsmet Kotak, 72, Turkish Cypriot journalist and politician, Member of Parliament, Labour Minister (1969–1976), Industry Minister (1982–1983), aortic dissection.
Isabell Masters, 98, American politician, third-party candidate for President of the United States (1984, 1992, 1996, 2000 and 2004).
Yuli Ofer, 87, Romanian-born Israeli businessman and entrepreneur.
Walter C. Righter, 87, American clergyman, bishop in the Episcopal Church, after long illness.
Andy Whitfield, 39, Welsh-born Australian actor (Spartacus: Blood and Sand), non-Hodgkin lymphoma.

12
Bill Cash, 92, American Negro league baseball player.
Frits Castricum, 64, Dutch politician, Member of the House of Representatives (1977–1994) and the Senate (1999–2003).
Alexander Galimov, 26, Russian ice hockey player, injuries sustained in the 2011 Lokomotiv Yaroslavl plane crash.
Mohammed Ghani Hikmat, 82, Iraqi sculptor, kidney failure.
Peter van Huizen, 79, Malaysian Olympic field hockey player.
Ralph Lomma, 87, American mini golf entrepreneur.
Wade Mainer, 104, American bluegrass musician, heart failure.
Allen Morgan, 86, American Olympic gold medal-winning (1948) coxswain, cancer.
Petro Tronko, 96, Ukrainian academician.

13
Walter Bonatti, 81, Italian mountain climber.
John Calley, 81, American movie studio executive.
Wilma Lee Cooper, 90, American country music singer, natural causes.
Sam DeLuca, 75, American football player and broadcaster (New York Jets), pancreatic cancer.
Arno Fischer, 84, German photographer.
Paul Gallant, 67, Canadian entrepreneur, inventor of Puzz-3D, cancer.
Jack Garner, 84, American actor (The Rockford Files, My Fellow Americans), brother of James Garner.
Richard Hamilton, 89, British artist.
David Jull, 66, Australian politician, Member of the House of Representatives (1975–1983, 1984–2007).
Joe Krupa, 78, American football player (Pittsburgh Steelers), heart ailment. 
DJ Mehdi, 34, French hip hop and house producer.
Harlan Erwin Mitchell, 87, American politician, U.S. Representative from Georgia (1958–1961).
Carl Oglesby, 76, American anti-war activist, lung cancer.
Gautam Rajadhyaksha, 60, Indian photographer.
Steven Michael Woods, Jr., 31, American murderer, executed by lethal injection.

14
Harishchandra Birajdar, 61, Indian Olympic wrestler (1972).
Lewis Brown, 56, American basketball player (Washington Bullets), heart attack.
*Choi Dong-Won, 53, South Korean baseball player (Lotte Giants, Samsung Lions), colon cancer.
Desmond FitzGerald, 29th Knight of Glin, 74, Irish hereditary knight.
Jorge Lavat, 78, Mexican actor.
Teodor Moraru, 73, Romanian painter.
Rudolf Mössbauer, 82, German physicist, Nobel Prize laureate (1961).
Frank Parkin, 80, British sociologist and novelist.
Buddy Tinsley, 87, American-born Canadian football player (Winnipeg Blue Bombers).
Malcolm Wallop, 78, American politician, United States Senator from Wyoming (1977–1995).

15
Frances Bay, 92, Canadian character actress (Happy Gilmore, Blue Velvet, The Middle).
José Manuel Rodriguez Delgado, 96, Spanish scientist and professor.
Clemente Faccani, 90, Italian Roman Catholic prelate, Apostolic Nuncio to Kenya (1983–1995) and Seychelles (1985–1994). 
Georges Fillioud, 82, French politician.
Dorothy Harrell, 87, American baseball player (All-American Girls Professional Baseball League).
John Hubert Kelly, 72, American diplomat.
Khalid Abdel Nasser, 62, Egyptian professor, eldest son of Gamal Abdel Nasser.
Mo Rothman, 92, Canadian-born American movie executive, persuaded Charlie Chaplin to return to the United States, Parkinson's disease.
Nykodym Rusnak, 90, Ukrainian Orthodox hierarch, Metropolitan of Kharkiv and Bohodukhiv (since 1989). 
Regina Smendzianka, 86, Polish pianist.
Bill Taylor, 81, American baseball player (New York Giants, Detroit Tigers).
Otakar Vávra, 100, Czech film director, screenwriter and pedagogue.

16
Ramon Amigó Anglès, 86, Spanish writer and teacher.
Lloyd Barber, 79, Canadian university executive.
Roger Belanger, 45, Canadian ice hockey player (Pittsburgh Penguins), heart attack.
Sir Brian Burnett, 98, British Air Chief Marshal, Chairman of the All England Club.
Bryce Crawford, 96, American scientist, member of the United States National Academy of Sciences.
Jordi Dauder, 73, Spanish actor.
Norma Eberhardt, 82, American actress (Live Fast, Die Young, The Return of Dracula), stroke.
Dave Gavitt, 73, American basketball coach, founder of the Big East Conference.
Sir William Hawthorne, 98, British aerospace engineer.
Kara Kennedy, 51, American television producer, daughter of Ted Kennedy, heart attack.
Jean Leclant, 91, French archaeologist and Egyptologist.
Stephen Mueller, 63, American painter, cancer.
Ted Mullighan, 72, Australian jurist, cancer.
Willie "Big Eyes" Smith, 75, American blues musician.
Tom Wilson, Sr., 80, American cartoonist (Ziggy).

17
Roger Agache, 85, French archaeologist.
Pedro Estay, 82, Chilean Olympic shooter.
Robert Frascino, 59, American immunologist.
Ernest House Sr., 65, American tribal leader, Chairman of the Ute Mountain Ute Tribe (1982–2010), injuries from a motorcycle accident.
Colin Madigan, 90, Australian architect.
Faidon Matthaiou, 87, Greek basketball player and coach.
George MacDonald Sacko, 75, Liberian footballer.
Eleanor Mondale, 51, American television personality, daughter of Walter Mondale, brain cancer.
Charles H. Percy, 91, American politician, Senator from Illinois (1967–1985), Alzheimer's disease.
Kurt Sanderling, 98, German conductor.
Ferenc Szojka, 80, Hungarian footballer.
Moisés Villanueva de la Luz, 47, Mexican politician, MP (2011). (body found on this date)
Peter Wright, 82, British police officer.
Tomasz Zygadło, 63, Polish film director.

18
Jack Adler, 94, American comic book artist.
Paul Bach, 72, English journalist and editor (Saga Magazine).
Mohammed Bassiouni, 74, Egyptian diplomat, Ambassador to Israel (1986–2000).
Tom Daly, 93, Canadian movie director and producer, long illness.
Norma Holloway Johnson, 79, American federal judge, first African American woman to serve as a district court chief judge, stroke.
Bayless Manning, 88, American lawyer, Dean of Stanford Law School (1964–1971), first President of the Council on Foreign Relations.
William F. May, 95, American film society founder (Film Society of Lincoln Center), heart failure.
Marcelino Palentini, 68, Italian-born Argentinian Roman Catholic prelate, Bishop of Jujuy (since 1995).
Aleksandr Potapov, 67, Soviet Olympic sailor.
Jamey Rodemeyer, 14, American gay activist, suicide by hanging.
Ivo Škrabalo, 77, Croatian writer, director and actor.
Imre Varga, 66, Hungarian Olympic judoka.
Swian Zanoni, 23, Brazilian motocross rider, race accident.

19
George Benton, 78, American boxer, pneumonia.
Thomas Capano, 61, American convicted murderer, heart attack.
Jo Carson, 64, American writer.
Bernard Collomb, 80, French racing driver.
Dolores Hope, 102, American philanthropist, widow of Bob Hope, natural causes.
Little Yellow Jacket, 15, American bucking bull.
Ginger McCain, 80, British horse trainer, cancer.
George Cadle Price, 92, Belizean politician, Prime Minister (1981–1984; 1989–1993).
Johnny Răducanu, 79, Romanian jazz musician, cardiac arrest.

20
Arvid Andersson, 92, Swedish Olympic weightlifter.
Johnny Barend, 82, American professional wrestler, natural causes.
Frank Driggs, 81, American Grammy Award-winning jazz producer, musician and archivist, natural causes.
Oscar Handlin, 95, American historian.
Michael Jarvis, 73, British horse trainer.
Aleksei Mamykin, 75, Russian footballer and coach.
Burhanuddin Rabbani, 70, Afghan politician, President (1992–1996, 2001), bomb attack.
Claude Rohla, 59, Luxembourgian Olympic archer.
Victor Blanchard Scheffer, 104, American mammalogist and author, natural causes.
Gaby Stenberg, 88, Swedish actress.
Per Unckel, 63, Swedish politician, Governor of Stockholm County (since 2007), cancer.
Urpo Vähäranta, 85, Finnish Olympic athlete.
Arch West, 97, American marketing executive credited with developing Doritos.
Robert Whitaker, 71, British photographer, shot The Beatles' butcher album cover, cancer.

21
Joe Abeywickrama, 84, Sri Lankan actor.
Lawrence Russell Brewer, 44, American convicted murderer, executed by lethal injection.
Troy Davis, 42, American convicted murderer, executed by lethal injection.
Michael Julian Drake, 65, American planetary scientist.
John Du Cann, 66, British musician (Atomic Rooster), heart attack.
Paulette Dubost, 100, French actress (The Rules of the Game, The Last Metro).
Ben Feleo, 85, Filipino film director.
Mickey Rottner, 92, American basketball player (Sheboygan Red Skins, Chicago Stags).
Pamela Ann Rymer, 70, American federal judge, cancer.
Naoki Sugiura, 79, Japanese actor, lung cancer.

22
*Mansoor Ali Khan Pataudi, 70, Indian cricketer, ninth and last Nawab of Pataudi (1952–1971), lung disease.
Peter E. Berger, 67, American film editor (Fatal Attraction, Star Trek, Alvin and the Chipmunks), leukemia.
Jonathan Cecil, 72, English actor.
Cengiz Dağcı, 92, Turkish language Crimean novelist and poet.
John H. Dick, 92, American naval officer and college basketball player.
Henry Lacey, 91, S African cricketer.
Robert Mistele, 91, American football coach.
Margaret Ogola, 53, Kenyan author.
Asbjørn Osnes, 79, Norwegian Olympic ski jumper.
Whatumoana Paki, 85, New Zealand Māori royal elder, widower of Te Atairangikaahu, father of King Tuheitia.
Aristides Pereira, 87, Cape Verdean politician and guerrilla leader, President (1975–1991).
Vic Roby, 93, American radio and television announcer.
Knut Steen, 86, Norwegian sculptor.
Vesta Williams, 53, American R&B singer, hypertensive heart disease.

23
Orlando Brown Sr., 40, American football player (Cleveland Browns, Baltimore Ravens), diabetic ketoacidosis.
Hubert Constant, 80, Haitian Roman Catholic prelate, Archbishop of Cap-Haïtien (2003–2008).
Luciano Galbo, 68, Italian cyclist.
Danny Litwhiler, 95, American baseball player and coach.
Guy Marcoux, 87, Canadian politician.
Rolland W. Redlin, 91, American politician, U.S. Representative from North Dakota (1965–1967).
Douglas Stuart, 20th Earl of Moray, 83, British aristocrat.
*Joseph Trinh Chinh Truc, 85, Vietnamese Roman Catholic prelate, Bishop of Ban Me Thuot (1990–2000).
José Miguel Varas, 83, Chilean writer.
Carl Wood, 81, Australian in vitro fertilisation pioneer, Alzheimer's disease.

24
Robert Chasowa, 25, Malawian political activist.
Surinder Kapoor, 86, Indian film producer, cardiac arrest.
Tony Knap, 96, American college football coach, Alzheimer's disease.
Konstantin Lerner, 61, Ukrainian chess grandmaster.
Emanuel Litvinoff, 96, British writer and human rights campaigner.
George Palliser, 92, British World War II fighter pilot.
Gusty Spence, 78, British Ulster loyalist, leader of the Ulster Volunteer Force.
Ken Yamauchi, 67, Japanese actor, pneumonia.

25
Len Allmond, 86, Australian rugby league footballer.
Theyab Awana, 21, Emirati footballer, traffic accident.
Denis Cannan, 92, British playwright.
Tony Conyers, 83, British journalist.
Erling Lars Dale, 65, Norwegian educationalist, cancer.
Norman Lawson, 75, English footballer and cricketer.
Sissy Löwinger, 70, Austrian actress, daughter of Paul Löwinger.
Wangari Maathai, 71, Kenyan environmental activist, MP and Nobel Peace Prize winner, cancer.
Helen Reichert, 109, American talk show personality and New York University professor.
Ali St. Louis, 52, Trinidadian Olympic athlete, traffic accident.

26
Sharon Anderson-Gold, 63, American professor, cancer.
Robert Blinc, 76, Slovene physicist.
Sergio Bonelli, 78, Italian comic book author and publisher.
Bob Cassilly, 61, American sculptor, founder of City Museum, bulldozer accident.
Jessy Dixon, 73, American gospel musician.
David Zelag Goodman, 81, American screenwriter (Straw Dogs), progressive supranuclear palsy.
Jerry Haynes, 84, American actor (RoboCop, Places in the Heart, Heartbreak Hotel), Parkinson's disease.
Harry Muskee, 70, Dutch blues singer and musician (Cuby + Blizzards), cancer.
Uan Rasey, 90, American trumpeter, heart ailment.
Michael Shor, 91, Israeli security official, CEO of Israel Military Industries (1972–1989).
Ron Toomer, 81, American roller coaster designer.

27
Mahmoud Abouelleil, 75-76, Egyptian politician.
Fernando Agüero, 94, Nicaraguan politician.
David Croft, 89, British television comedy writer and producer (Are You Being Served?, Dad's Army).
Sara Douglass, 54, Australian fantasy author, ovarian cancer.
Ida Fink, 89, Israeli Polish-language author.
Wilson Greatbatch, 92, American engineer, inventor of the implantable cardiac pacemaker.
Dave Hill, 74, American golfer, complications from emphysema.
Imre Makovecz, 75, Hungarian architect.
Richard W. Mallary, 82, American politician, U.S. Representative from Vermont (1972–1975).
"Country" Johnny Mathis, 80, American country music singer-songwriter.
Chus Pereda, 73, Spanish football player and manager.
Stuart Spencer, 79, Australian footballer.
Joe Tofflemire, 46, American football player (Seattle Seahawks), heart failure.
Erik Wedersøe, 73, Danish actor.
Johnnie Wright, 97, American country music singer (Johnnie & Jack), husband of Kitty Wells.
Cizia Zykë, 61, French writer and adventurer.

28
James E. Bowman, 88, American physician.
Patrick Collinson, 82, British historian.
Pierre Dansereau, 99, Canadian ecologist.
Charles J. Donlan, 95, American NASA researcher and manager.
Heidi, 3, American-born cross-eyed opossum at Leipzig Zoo, euthanised.
Chingis Izmailov, 67, Russian psychophysiologist.
Claude R. Kirk, Jr., 85, American politician, Governor of Florida (1967–1971).
Nick Navarro, 81, American law enforcement official, Sheriff of Broward County, Florida (1985–1992), complications of cancer.

29
Eddie Bockman, 91, American baseball player, manager and scout (Pittsburgh Pirates, New York Yankees).
Charles Brooks, 90, American editorial cartoonist.
Len Castle, 86, New Zealand potter.
Hella Haasse, 93, Dutch writer.
Philip Hannan, 98, American Roman Catholic prelate, Archbishop of New Orleans (1965–1988).
Nonie Lynch, 101, Irish traditional singer.
Tatyana Lioznova, 87, Russian film director (Seventeen Moments of Spring), People's Artist of the USSR.
Vera Popkova, 68, Russian athlete, Olympic bronze medalist (1968). 
Sylvia Robinson, 76, American singer (Mickey & Sylvia), music producer and record label executive, heart failure.
Lojze Slak, 79, Slovene accordion player, bone cancer.
Iain Sproat, 72, Scottish politician and journalist.

30
Va'aelua Eti Alesana, Samoan politician, President of the Tautua Samoa Party (since 2011).
João d'Avila Moreira Lima, 92, Brazilian Roman Catholic prelate, Auxiliary Bishop of São Sebastião do Rio de Janeiro (1982–2002).
Anwar al-Awlaki, 40, American-born Yemeni cleric and Al-Qaeda official, airstrike.
Pilar Barril, 79, Spanish tennis player.
Lee Davenport, 95, American physicist, helped develop SCR-584 radar, cancer.
Gilberto Fernandez, 76, Cuban-born American Roman Catholic prelate, Auxiliary Bishop of Miami (1997–2002).
Mykhaylo Forkash, 63, Ukrainian footballer.
Peter Gent, 69, American football player (Dallas Cowboys) and author (North Dallas Forty).
Alexander Grant, 86, New Zealand ballet dancer.
Mike Heimerdinger, 58, American football coach (Tennessee Titans), cancer.
Gaspar Henaine, 84, Mexican comedian.
Mumtaz Jajja, 63, Pakistani politician, dengue fever.
Roger G. Kennedy, 85, American civil servant, Director of the National Park Service (1993–1997), melanoma.
Samir Khan, 25, Saudi-born American jihadist and publisher (Inspire''), airstrike.
Ram Dayal Munda, 72, Indian scholar and activist.
Sir Arthur Norman, 94, British industrialist.
Clifford Olson, 71, Canadian serial killer, cancer.
Ralph M. Steinman, 68, Canadian immunologist, announced as 2011 Nobel Laureate in Medicine, pancreatic cancer.
Marv Tarplin, 70, American guitarist and songwriter, original member of The Miracles.

References

2011-09
 09